How Green Is the Valley is the second studio album of The Men They Couldn't Hang. It was released in 1986 after the band were signed to MCA Records following the success of their previous album Night of a Thousand Candles. It is the last album to feature co-founder Shanne Bradley on bass guitar.

Singles
Three singles were released from the album: "Gold Rush", which included "Gold Strike" on the 12" version, "Ghosts of Cable Street" and "Shirt of Blue". "Ghosts of Cable Street", a song detailing the battle of Cable Street in 1936, used actual recordings of mounted police which could be heard outside the Wapping studios as it was during the time of the Wapping Printers Strike. "Shirt of Blue" was another song, typical of The Men They Couldn't Hang writing material on British history, was the subject of the UK miners' strike (1984–1985). The video features press footage of the conflict between striking miners and the police. The cassette version is the only one to feature additional tracks which were recorded during a live performance at the Electric Ballroom in London's Camden Town.

Personnel
Credits adapted from AllMusic.

The Men They Couldn't Hang
 Shanne Bradley - bass guitar
 Stefan Cush (a.k.a. Cush) – vocals, guitar, horn
 Jon Odgers – drums, percussion
 Philip Odgers (a.k.a. Swill) – vocals, guitar, tinwhistle, melodica, recorder
 Paul Simmonds - guitar, bouzuki, mandolin, lute, biscuits

Additional musicians
 Lindsey Lowe – trumpet
 Bobby Valentino – Violin

Additional personnel
 Mick Glossop – production and engineering
 Richard Haughton – album artwork
 Paul Cox – photography

Track listing

References

1986 albums
The Men They Couldn't Hang albums
MCA Records albums